Nereo Fernández (born April 13, 1979 in Santa Fe, Argentina) is a retired Argentine footballer.

References

External links
 Profile at BDFA 

1979 births
Living people
Argentine footballers
Argentine expatriate footballers
Gimnasia y Esgrima de Jujuy footballers
Club de Gimnasia y Esgrima La Plata footballers
Unión de Santa Fe footballers
Boca Unidos footballers
Club Deportivo Palestino footballers
Argentinos Juniors footballers
Atlético de Rafaela footballers
Primera Nacional players
Argentine Primera División players
Chilean Primera División players
Argentine expatriate sportspeople in Chile
Expatriate footballers in Chile
Association football goalkeepers
Footballers from Santa Fe, Argentina